2017 Liga Futsal Kebangsaan will be the tenth season of the National Futsal League, the Malaysian professional futsal league for association football clubs, since its establishment in 2004. FELDA United FC are the defending champions, having won their second title in the 2014-15 season. The league was on hold for 2016 season after a financial problem and postponed to January 2017 for the new season. All matches to be played at Kompleks Sukan UPSI, Tanjung Malim, Perak and Stadium Tertutup SUKPA, Kuantan, Pahang.

Teams
  Felda United (2014-15 champions)
  KL Petaling Putra
  T-Team
  Melaka
  MBPP
  KL TPD
  Perak
  Pahang
  KL City

League table

Result table

References

External links
 Arena Futsal Malaysia
 Football Association of Malaysia

Liga Futsal Kebangsaan seasons